Uwe Römer (born 4 April 1969) is a German fencer. He competed in the individual and team foil events at the 1996 Summer Olympics.

References

External links
 

1969 births
Living people
German male fencers
Olympic fencers of Germany
Fencers at the 1996 Summer Olympics
Sportspeople from Frankfurt